Arctotraversodontinae is a subfamily of Late Triassic cynodonts belonging to the family Traversodontidae. Members of the subfamily include Arctotraversodon, Boreogomphodon and Plinthogomphodon from North America, and Habayia, Maubeugia, Microscalenodon and Rosieria from Europe.

Classification
The subfamily was erected in 2020 by Hendrickx et al., who defined it as all traversodontids more closely related to Arctotraversodon plemmyridon than to Massetognathus pascuali or Gomphodontosuchus brasiliensis. In their cladistic analysis, they found Arctotraversodontinae to be the sister taxon of the subfamily Gomphodontosuchinae. Below is a cladogram from that analysis:

References

Traversodontids
Late Triassic first appearances
Late Triassic extinctions
Prehistoric animal subfamilies
Therapsid subfamilies